Tim Moen is a Canadian libertarian podcaster, blogger, activist and politician. He was the leader of the Libertarian Party of Canada from May 2014 to August 2021. Outside of politics, he is a firefighter, paramedic, business owner and filmmaker.

Political career 
Moen became the leader of the Libertarian Party of Canada in May 2014, succeeding former leader Katrina Chowne. He ran in the 2014 Fort McMurray—Athabasca by-election. His campaign received considerable attention from a variety of Canadian and US news outlets, such as CNN, Huffington Post, Reason.com, due to his social media memes explaining libertarianism.

Political positions 
Moen is an anarcho-capitalist. He supports ending all government surveillance programs, withdrawing all troops stationed abroad, legalizing cannabis, decriminalizing drugs, legalizing prostitution, and tax cuts.

Electoral record

Personal life 
Moen is married and lives with his wife and four children near Edmonton, Alberta. He is an atheist.

References

External links 
 

Year of birth missing (living people)
Living people
Anarcho-capitalists
Canadian atheists
Canadian libertarians
Canadian bloggers
Canadian podcasters
Free speech activists
Libertarian Party of Canada leaders
Non-interventionism
People from Fort McMurray